Kibaale District, is a district in the Western Region of Uganda. The district headquarters are in the town of Kibaale.

Location
Kibaale District is bordered by Hoima District to the north, Kyankwanzi District to the north-east, Mubende District to the east, Kyegegwa District to the south-east, Kyenjojo District and Kabarole District to the south-west, and Ntoroko District to the west. The coordinates of the district are 00°47'00.0"N, 31°05'00.0"E (Latitude:0.783333; Longitude:31.083333).

Overview

The largest town in the district is Kagadi, in Buyaga County, followed by Karuguuza in Buyanja County. A main trunk road was built in 1997, the result of co-operation between the governments of Uganda and Ireland. The road connects the towns of Mubende, Kakumiro, Kibaale, and Kagadi.

The Ugandan government had plans in 2012 to split the district into three smaller districts. Those plans, however, are on hold because of  funding constraints.

History
Kibaale District is part of the Kingdom of Bunyoro, one of the traditional monarchies in Uganda. The kingdom is coterminous with the Bunyoro sub-region. Kibaale District is part of an area known as  the "Lost Counties”. The 1900 Uganda Agreement defined the boundaries of the Buganda Kingdom, including the important areas of Bunyoro south and east of the Kafu River. The “Lost Counties” were included as a sub-national territorial element of Buganda. The administration of the Lost Counties as well as Bunyoro itself was modelled on the Buganda political system and under the leadership of Baganda chiefs. In a referendum held in November 1964, the residents in the two lost counties voted to return to the Kingdom of Bunyoro.

Ebola outbreak
In July 2012, an outbreak of Ebola virus disease was reported in Kagadi, and as of 14 August 2012, had infected 24 and killed 16, a 66 percent case fatality rate.  Officials urged people not to panic, and a national emergency task force was established.  The government, the World Health Organization, and the U.S. Centers for Disease Control and Prevention sent experts to tackle the outbreak.

Population
The 1991 national population census estimated the district population at 220,300. In 2002, the national census put the population at 405,900.  The annual population growth rate of the district was estimated at 5.4 percent. It has been estimated that the population in 2012 was 681,300.

Demographics

According to the 2002 national census, about 60 percent of the population were Catholics, 30 percent belonged to the Church of Uganda, and 3 percent were Muslim. Only about 1 percent of the inhabitants live in urban settlements. Kibaale District has the highest fertility rate in Uganda (8.2).

See also
 Districts of Uganda

References

External links
 Eleven New Sub-counties for Kibaale District

 
Districts of Uganda
Western Region, Uganda
Bunyoro sub-region
Lake Albert (Africa)